Virola rufula is a species of tree in the family Myristicaceae.

The tree contains alkaloids in its bark, leaves and roots. methoxy-dimethyltryptamine makes up 95% of the alkaloids. There is about 0.190% 5-MeO-DMT in bark, 0.135% 5-MeO-DMT in root, and 0.092% dimethyltryptamine in the leaves.

References

rufula